Matt McGue is an American behavior geneticist and Regents Professor of psychology at the University of Minnesota, where he co-directs the Minnesota Center for Twin and Family Research.

Career
McGue received his B.A. in psychology (minor: mathematics) from the University of California, Berkeley in 1975 and his Ph.D. from the University of Minnesota in 1981. After completing his Ph.D. he was an instructor and later assistant professor at the Washington University School of Medicine until 1985. He returned to the University of Minnesota and eventually became full professor there in 1992.

He was elected president of the Behavior Genetics Association in 2002 and was president of the International Society for Twin Studies from 2008 to 2010.

References

External links 
 Matt McGue University of Minnesota
 Introduction to Human Behavioral Genetics with Matt McGue (Coursera)
 
 17-topic course on Behavioral Genetics taught at University of Minnesota in fall 2020
 Distinguished Contributor Interview at a meeting of the International Society for Intelligence Research, July 2022]

Living people
Year of birth missing (living people)
21st-century American psychologists
Behavior geneticists
People from Oakland, California
University of Minnesota alumni
University of Minnesota faculty
University of California, Berkeley alumni
American geneticists
Washington University School of Medicine faculty